The Starlite Room is a 1925 brick building in Downtown Edmonton, Alberta, Canada, one block south of Jasper Avenue, the city's main street. The building was originally built as a "citadel" (church or place of worship) for the Salvation Army. By 1965 it was converted into the first venue of the Citadel Theatre company, with the company taking its name from the name of the building. After the company moved to a new purpose-built theatre building on Churchill Square in 1978, the building was converted to a concert hall and bar. The concert venue inside was for many years named the Rev Cabaret. Under this name, it hosted a variety of concerts including early 1990s shows of then-unknown American bands Nirvana and Green Day. In 2003 the Rev closed, and was reopened as the Starlite Room in 2004, which operates as a members-only club. The lounge/bar downstairs is called "River City Revival House" which opened in 2018.

Boocha, the first kombucha brewery in Edmonton, moved into the historic building in the fall of 2017.

Concerts

The following are some of the artists that have performed at The Starlite Room:

A-Trak
Abigail Williams
Adrian Belew Power Trio
Against Me!
Agnostic Front
Alexisonfire
Alkaline Trio
All That Remains
Amon Amarth
Amorphis
Anberlin
...And You Will Know Us by the Trail of Dead
Arch Enemy
Arkells
As I Lay Dying
Atmosphere
Avenged Sevenfold
Baroness
Battles
Bedouin Soundclash
Big Sugar
The Birthday Massacre
Bison B.C.
Brant Bjork
The Black Dahlia Murder
Black Lungs
The Bouncing Souls
Boys Night Out
Divine Brown
Behemoth
Blind Guardian
Built to Spill
By Divine Right
Cancer Bats
Cannibal Corpse
Caribou
The Casualties
Celtic Frost
CKY
Classified
Comeback Kid
controller.controller
Converge
Constantines
Champion et ses G-Strings
Melanie C
Choke
Chromeo
Clutch
Cracker
The Creepshow
Damageplan
Daniel Wesley
Dark Tranquillity
Datarock
The Dears
Death by Stereo
Death From Above 1979
Decapitated
Deicide
Del the Funky Homosapien
Destruction
The Devil Wears Prada (band)
The Dillinger Escape Plan
Dinosaur Bones
Do Make Say Think
The Donnas
Dragonette
Dread Zeppelin
Dry Kill Logic
Earthless
Edguy
Edward Sharpe & The Magnetic Zeros
Electric Six
Ensiferum
Epica
Fear Factory
Feist
Fintroll
For Today
Black Francis
Frog Eyes
From Autumn to Ashes
The Gaslight Anthem
Giant Sand
Girl Talk
God Forbid
Matthew Good
Guttermouth
HammerFall
Hatebreed
The Haunted
Hollywood Undead
The Holly Springs Disaster
Holy Fuck
HorrorPops
Ill Bill
illScarlett
The (International) Noise Conspiracy
Islands
Jakalope
Johnny Marr
Juliette and the Licks
July Talk
K-os
Kate Voegele
King's X
KMFDM
Kool Keith
Korpiklaani
Kreator
Lacuna Coil
Ladytron
Lights
LTJ Bukem
Local H
Mad Caddies
Marianas Trench
Mastodon
Matt Mays
Mayhem
MC Conrad
Metric
The Midway State
Mike Plume Band
Minus the Bear
Mindless Self Indulgence
Misery Signals
MGMT
Mobile
Moneen
Moonspell
Most Serene Republic
Motion City Soundtrack
Bob Mould
MSTRKRFT
Mumiy Troll
Municipal Waste
Murder by Death
Nashville Pussy
Necro
Necrophagist
Nightwish
Nirvana
No Use For a Name
Norma Jean
Obituary
Omnium Gatherum
Overkill
The Parlor Mob
Pelican
Phantogram
The Philosopher Kings
Plain White T's
Plants and Animals
Poison the Well
Pretty Girls Make Graves
Priestess
Propagandhi
Protest the Hero
Purity Ring
The Red Jumpsuit Apparatus
Rotting Christ
Run The Jewels
The Rural Alberta Advantage
Said The Whale
Saint Alvia
Saosin
Savages
Saving Abel
Secondhand Serenade
Senses Fail
She Wants Revenge
Shadows Fall
Shout Out Out Out Out
Silverstein
Silent Line
SNFU
Sleepercar
Sleigh Bells
Sloan
Small Sins
Social Code
Soilwork
Son Volt
Sonata Arctica
Soulfly
Sparta
The Spill Canvas
The Smalls
Stabilo
Stereos
Strapping Young Lad
Stratovarius
Strung Out
Suffocation
Supersuckers
Switchfoot
Sworn Enemy
the Tea Party
Ted Leo and the Pharmacists
Ten Second Epic
Terror
Therapy?
Therion
Thriving Ivory
Thunderheist
Tiga
Tiger Army
The Toasters
Tortoise
Tokyo Police Club
Tsunami Bomb
Tyler, The Creator
Twin Shadow
Unearth
The Unseen
David Usher
Vader
VNV Nation
Cadence Weapon
Josh Wink
Wintersleep
You Say Party! We Say Die!
Zeke
3
3 Inches of Blood
Thirty Seconds to Mars
Questlove

References

External links
Starlite Room official website
Boocha - Kombucha Brewery Based in Basement

Nightclubs in Alberta
Music venues in Edmonton
Churches completed in 1925
Former churches in Canada
Old Citadel
2004 establishments in Alberta
Salvationism in Canada
20th-century religious buildings and structures in Canada